= Zhigegor Monastery =

Buddhist monastery in Qinghai, China

Religion
- Affiliation: Tibetan Buddhism

Location
- Location: Qinghai, China
- Country: China

Zhigegor Monastery is a Buddhist monastery in Qinghai, China.
